USS Okisko was a Small Steam Harbor Tug in service with the United States Navy from 1940 to 1947. Built in 1939 as the Tugboat Cornelius Kroll, she was purchased from Terry Dalehite Towing Co. on 29 October 1940 by the U.S. Navy, renamed USS Okisko (YN-42) and converted for naval service at Naval Station New Orleans and in active service by 19 December 1940. Allocated to the 6th Naval District at Charleston, South Carolina, she also served in the 8th Naval District in 1944 before being decommissioned on 21 February 1947 after a naval career of 7 years. After being struck from the naval register, on 8 May 1947, she made a return to civilian life, as the Tug Wilcox of the Wilcox Floating Equipment Co. Over 20 years later, she was purchased by the Reinauer Transportation Co., of Staten Island, New York whilst retaining her name. Her fate is unknown.

Ship names and designations

Over the years, Okisko has enjoyed a variety of names, including;
Cornelius Kroll 1939-1940
USS Okisko YN-42 29 October 1940 – 8 April 1942
USS Okisko YNT-10 8 April 1942 – 2 August 1945
USS Okisko YTL-735 2 August 1945 – 8 May 1947
Wilcox

Ship Awards

American Defense Service Medal
American Campaign Medal
World War II Victory Medal

External links
- NavSource Archives, YTL-735 OKISKO
- Tugboat Information

1939 ships
Ships of the United States Navy